Athylia fuscosticta is a species of beetle in the family Cerambycidae. It was described by Breuning and Jong in 1941.

References

Athylia
Beetles described in 1941